The following highways are numbered 863:

United States